The molecular formula C9H13N3 (molar mass: 163.22 g/mol, exact mass: 163.1109 u) may refer to:

 Pyridinylpiperazine, or 1-(2-Pyridinyl)piperazine
 ABT-202

Molecular formulas